A sash is a large and usually colorful ribbon or band of material worn around the body, either draping from one shoulder to the opposing hip and back up, or else running around the waist. The sash around the waist may be worn in daily attire, but the sash from shoulder to hip is worn on ceremonial occasions only. Ceremonial sashes are also found in a V-shaped format, draping straight from both shoulders down, intersecting and forming an angle over the chest or abdomen.

Military use

Old Europe 

In the mid- and late-16th century waist and shoulder sashes came up as mark of (high) military rank or to show personal affection to a political party or nation. During the Thirty Years' War the distinctive sash colour of the House of Habsburg was red while their French opponents wore white or blue sashes and the Swedish voted for blue sashes.

Beginning from the end of the 17th century, commissioned officers in the British Army wore waist sashes of crimson silk. The original officer's sash was six inches wide by eighty-eight inches long with a ten-inch (gold or silver) fringe. It was large enough to form a hammock stretcher to carry a wounded officer. From about 1730 to 1768, the officer's sash was worn baudericke wise, i.e. from the right shoulder to the left hip, and afterwards around the waist again.

Sergeants were permitted sashes of crimson wool, with a single stripe of facing colour following the clothing regulations of 1727. Whereas it remained vague whether the sash was to be worn over the shoulder or around the waist, it was clarified in 1747 that sergeants had to wear their sashes around the waist. From 1768, the sergeant's waist sash had one (until 1825) resp. three (until 1845) stripes of facing colour; in regiments with red or purple facings the sergeant's sash had white stripes or remained plain crimson.

Until 1914 waist-sashes in distinctive national colours were worn as a peace-time mark of rank by officers of the Imperial German, Austro-Hungarian and Russian armies, amongst others.

Modern Europe 
Since then sashes have been part of formal military attire (compare the sword-belt known as a baldric, and the cummerbund). Thus several other modern armies retain waist-sashes for wear by officers in ceremonial uniforms. These include the armies of Norway (crimson sashes), Sweden (yellow and blue), Greece (light blue and white), the Netherlands (orange), Portugal (crimson) and Spain (red and gold for generals, light blue for general staff and crimson for infantry officers).

The Spanish  Regulares (infantry descended from colonial regiments formerly recruited in Spanish Morocco) retain their historic waist-sashes for all ranks in colours that vary according to the unit.

Sashes are a distinctive feature of some regiments of the modern French Army for parade dress. They are worn around the waist in the old Algerian or zouave style ("ceinture de laine"). In the historic French Army of Africa, sashes were worn around the waist in either blue for European or red for indigenous troops.

(British) Commonwealth of Nations 
The modern British Army retains a scarlet sash for wear in certain orders of dress by sergeants and above serving in infantry regiments, over the right shoulder to the left hip. A similar crimson silk net sash is worn around the waist by officers of the Foot Guards in scarlet full dress and officers of line infantry in dark blue "Number 1" dress. The same practice is followed in some Commonwealth armies.

The present-day armies of India and Pakistan both make extensive use of waist-sashes for ceremonial wear. The colours vary widely according to regiment or branch and match those of the turbans where worn. Typically two or more colours are incorporated in the sash, in vertical stripes. One end hangs loose at the side and may have an ornamental fringe. The practice of wearing distinctive regimental sashes or cummerbunds goes back to the late nineteenth century.

Cross-belts resembling sashes are worn by Drum Majors in the Dutch, British and some Commonwealth armies. These carry scrolls bearing the names of battle honours.

United States of America 

In the United States, George Washington, who served as commander-in-chief of the Continental Army during the American Revolutionary War and later served as the first President of the United States, was noted for wearing a blue ribbed sash, similar to that of the British Order of the Garter, early in the war, as he had in 1775 prescribed the use of green, pink, and blue sashes to identify aides de camp, brigade-majors, brigadiers general, majors general, and the commander in chief in the absence of formal uniforms. He later gave up the sash as "unrepublican" and "pretentious for all but the highest-ranking aristocracy," according to historians. Washington is seen wearing the sash in Charles Wilson Peale's 1779 painting Washington at Princeton.

Sashes continued to be used in the United States Army for sergeants and officers. In 1821 the red sashes (crimson for officers) were limited to first sergeants and above. In 1872 the sashes were abolished by all ranks but generals who continued to wear their buff silk sashes in full dress until 1917. Waist sashes (in combination with a sabre) in the old style are still worn by the officers and senior NCOs of the Commander-in-Chief's Guard of the 3rd U.S. Infantry Regiment (The Old Guard) as well by the West Point Band drum major along with the West Point cadet officers. The drum major of the Old Guard Fife and Drum Corps also still wears a waist sash, but no sidearms.

At the time of the American Civil War (1861–65) generals of the regular US Army wore silk sashes in buff. Officers were authorized silk sashes in crimson (medical officers: emerald) while red woolen sashes were entitled to senior non-commissioned officers (Army Regulations of 1861). In the Confederate Army sashes were worn by all sergeant ranks and officers. The colour indicated the corps or status of the wearer. For example: yellow for cavalry, burgundy for infantry, black for chaplains, red for sergeants, green or blue for medics, and grey or cream for general officers.

Japan 
Japanese officers continued the practice in full dress uniform until 1940.

Modern civilian and cultural use

With the genesis of complex systems of military and civilian awards during the 18th century in most European countries, sashes became a distinguishing part of decorations and are mostly worn along with medals or orders. Today most of the European royal families wear sashes as a part of their royal (and/or military) regalia. Some orders such as the Légion d'honneur include sashes as part of the seniormost grades' insignia. Likewise, Italian military officers wear light blue sashes over the right shoulder on ceremonial occasions.

In Latin America and some countries of Africa, a special presidential sash indicates a president's authority. In France and Italy, sashes, featuring the national flag tricolours and worn on the right shoulder, are used by public authorities and local officials, such as legislators, in public ceremonial events.

In the United States, the sash has picked up a more ceremonial and less practical purpose. Sashes are used at higher education commencement ceremonies, by high school homecoming parade nominees, in beauty pageants, as well as by corporations to acknowledge high achievement.

In Canada, hand-woven sashes (called ceintures fléchées and sometimes "L'Assomption sash" after a Québec town in which they were mass-produced) were derived from Iroquois carrying belts sometime in the 18th century. As a powerful multi-use tool this sash found use in the fur trade which brought it into the North West by French voyageurs. In this period the weave got tighter and size expanded, with some examples more than four metres in length. Coloured thread was widely used. The sash is a shared cultural emblem between French-Canadians and Métis peoples. Today it is considered to be primarily a symbol of the 1837 Lower Canada Rebellion Patriotes and the Métis Nation. In modern times, Bonhomme Carnaval, snowman mascot of the Quebec Winter Carnival wears a ceintures fléchées as part of his attire in recognition of the province's heritage.

In the British Isles, especially Northern Ireland, the sash is a symbol of the Orange Order. Orange Order sashes were originally of the ceremonial shoulder-to-hip variety as worn by the British military. Over the 20th century, the sash has been mostly replaced by V-shaped collarettes, which are still generally referred to as sashes. The item is celebrated in the song 'The Sash my Father Wore'.

Sashes are also worn by Girl Scouts, Boy Scouts and Beauty Pageant Participants.  Badges are sewn onto the sash, to indicate achievements of the Scout.

Sashes are part of the diplomatic uniform of many countries.

Many modern schools of Chinese martial arts use sashes of various colors to denote rank as a reflection of the Japanese ranking system using belts.

The Japanese equivalent of a sash, obi, serves to hold a kimono or yukata together.

Honorific orders 
Sashes are indicative of holding the class of Grand Cross or Grand Cordon in a chivalric order or an order of merit. The sash is usually worn from the right shoulder to the left hip. A few orders do the contrary, according to their traditional statute.

Orders with the sash worn on the left shoulder 

Europe:
 :  Order of the Elephant
 :  Order of the Falcon
 :  Order of the White Eagle
 :  Order of the Garter
  (Scotland):  Order of the Thistle

Asia:
 : Grand Order of Mugunghwa
 : Order of the Royal House of Chakri
 : Order of Chula Chom Klao
 : Knight Grand Cordon (Special Class) on left shoulder but Knight Grand Cross (First Class): right shoulder, for:
 Order of the White Elephant
 Order of the Crown of Thailand

Classified examples of current orders' sashes

See also
Presidential sash
West Point Cadets' Sword
Order (honour)
Phaleristics
Religious sash

References

Bibliography

External links

Belts (clothing)
Fashion accessories
 
Shawls and wraps